Nancye Wynne Bolton (née Wynne; 2 December 1916 – 9 November 2001) was a tennis player from Australia.  She won the women's singles title six times at the Australian Championships, third only to Margaret Court's and Serena Williams' 11 and 7 titles respectively. Bolton won 20 titles at the Australian Championships, second only to Court's 23 titles.

According to Wallis Myers and John Orloff of The Daily Telegraph and the Daily Mail, Bolton was ranked in the world top ten in 1938, 1947, and 1948 (no rankings issued from 1940 through 1945), reaching a career high of World No. 4 in those rankings in 1947 and 1948. According to Ned Potter of American Lawn Tennis magazine, Bolton was the second ranked player in 1947, behind Louise Brough.

She married George Bolton on 6 July 1940. He was a RAAF pilot and was killed in May 1942 during a raid on Germany.

Bolton was inducted into the International Tennis Hall of Fame in 2004.

Grand Slam tournament finals

Singles: 9 (6 titles, 3 runner-ups)

Doubles: 12 (10 titles, 2 runner-ups)

Mixed doubles: 8 (4 titles, 4 runner-ups)

Grand Slam singles tournament timeline

See also 
 Performance timelines for all female tennis players who reached at least one Grand Slam final

Notes

References

External links
 
 

1916 births
2001 deaths
Australian Championships (tennis) champions
Australian female tennis players
International Tennis Hall of Fame inductees
Sportswomen from Victoria (Australia)
Grand Slam (tennis) champions in women's singles
Grand Slam (tennis) champions in women's doubles
Grand Slam (tennis) champions in mixed doubles
Tennis players from Melbourne
People educated at Lauriston Girls' School
People from Mentone, Victoria
People educated at Mentone Girls' Grammar School
20th-century Australian women